Kathryn Ann Whitehead (born 1980) is an American chemist who is a professor at Carnegie Mellon University. Her research considers the development of nanomaterial-based drug delivery systems for gene therapy. She was elected Fellow of the American Institute for Medical and Biological Engineering in 2021.

Early life and education 
Whitehead is from Allentown, Pennsylvania. She earned her bachelor’s degree in chemical engineering at the University of Delaware, then moved to the University of California, Santa Barbara, where she studied methods to improve the oral delivery of macromolecules. Whitehead was a postdoctoral researcher at the Koch Institute for Integrative Cancer Research, where she worked alongside Robert S. Langer on RNA interference therapeutics.

Research and career 
Whitehead's research considers the development of drug delivery systems for gene therapy. She is interested in the development of nanoparticle materials to deliver messenger RNA (mRNA) to specific cells. Targeted mRNA delivery provides physicians with a personalized strategy to treat genetic disorders. Alongside mRNA, Whitehead has studied small interfering RNA, which can be used to control gene expression. In general, mRNA promotes gene expression, whilst siRNA is used to silence over-expressed genes. She focuses on the development of delivery systems for leukocytes (including B cells) and intestinal epithelium. A challenge with using mRNA for therapeutic purposes is that the body often recognizes intruder mRNA and attacks it, triggering an immune response. She worked with Katalin Karikó and Drew Weissman on the development of the lipid nanoparticles that enabled the mRNA-based COVID-19 vaccines.

In an attempt to better design drug delivery systems, Whitehead has investigated the cellular components of breast milk. She is interested in whether it is possible to genetically engineer cells to treat children's allergies, or orally administer vaccines to infants.

Whitehead is passionate about science communication and improving public trust in science. In 202, she delivered a TED talk on lipid nanoparticles and how mRNA will transform biology. In 2022, Whitehead delivered the convocation address at the Carnegie Mellon University.

Awards and honors 
 Elected Fellow of the American Institute for Medical and Biological Engineering
 DARPA Young Faculty Award
 Popular Science Brilliant Ten
 MIT Technology Review Innovator Under 35
 American Society for Engineering Education Curtis W. McGraw Research Award

Selected publications

References 

Living people
1980 births
Educators from Allentown, Pennsylvania
Scientists from Allentown, Pennsylvania
University of Delaware alumni
University of California, Santa Barbara alumni
Carnegie Mellon University faculty
21st-century American chemists
20th-century American chemists
American women chemists